Salomo is a different name for Solomon, son of David, who was king of Israel around 970 to 931 BC.

It may also refer to:

Salomo of Makuria, ruler of the Nubian kingdom of Makuria (1080–1089)
Salomo Glassius (May 20, 1593–July 27, 1656), German theologian and biblical critic
Johann Salomo Semler (December 18, 1725–March 14, 1791), German church historian and biblical commentator
Karl Salomo Zachariae von Lingenthal, (September 14, 1769–March 27, 1843), German jurist
Ernst Benjamin Salomo Raupach (May 21, 1784–March 18, 1852), German dramatist
Soma Morgenstern (May 3, 1890–April 17, 1976), Jewish-Austrian writer and journalist
Salomó, a village in the Catalan district of Tarragonès (Spain)